Sir Francis Charlton, 2nd Baronet (1651–1729), of Whitton Court, Shropshire, was an English politician.

He was a Member (MP) of the Parliament of England for Ludlow in March 1679, October 1679 and 1681, and for Bishop's Castle in 1685.

References

1651 births
1729 deaths
Baronets in the Baronetage of England
English MPs 1679
English MPs 1681
Politicians from Shropshire
English MPs 1685–1687